The following is a list of notable artists who play, compose, have played, or have composed albums or pieces of drone music or drone metal.

A

Oren Ambarchi
Ellen Arkbro
Asva
Kenneth Atchley
Author & Punisher

B

Aidan Baker
William Basinski
Bass Communion
Biosphere
Birchville Cat Motel
The Black Angels
The Body
Bohren & der Club of Gore
Boris
Bowery Electric
Glenn Branca
Brighter Death Now
Bull of Heaven
Burial Chamber Trio
Burning Witch
Terry Burrows

C

The Caretaker
Celer (group)
Sheila Chandra
Cleric
Tony Conrad
Corrupted

D

Sarah Davachi
Demdike Stare
Andrew Deutsch
Alio Die
Diesel Guitar
Kyle Bobby Dunn

E

Earth
Eleh
Jean-Claude Éloy
Emeralds
Espers
Helena Espvall

F

Fennesz
Ben Frost
Fuck Buttons
Fursaxa
The Futurians

G

Gas
The Gersch
Gescom
Gnaw Their Tongues
Gnaw
Goatsnake
Godspeed You! Black Emperor
Mathias Grassow
Growing
Grouper

H

Hafler Trio
Keiji Haino
Halo
Hammock
Robert Hampson
The Haxan Cloak
Tom Heasley
Tim Hecker
Christoph Heemann
Hell
Catherine Christer Hennix

I

If Thousands
Ryoji Ikeda
Tetsu Inoue
Rafael Anton Irisarri
Iroha

J

Jane
Jesu
Jóhann Jóhannsson

K

Khanate
Khlyst
Thomas Köner

L

Labradford
Landing
Lawrence English
Liars
Sarah Lipstate
Locrian
Loscil

M

Machinefabriek
Maeror Tri
Main
Kali Malone
Stephan Mathieu
Melvins
Mirror
Moss
Alexi Murdoch

N

Nadja
Naked City
Natural Snow Buildings
Neurosis
Phill Niblock
Nurse With Wound

R

Jim O'Rourke

O

Pauline Oliveros
Om
Oneohtrix Point Never
Ox

P

Charlemagne Palestine
Pharmakon
Puce Mary

R

Eliane Radigue
The Resonance Association
Trent Reznor
Robert Rich
Atticus Ross
Esa Ruoho

S

Klaus Schulze
The Sight Below
Stars of the Lid
Stars Over Foy
Sunn O)))
Swans
Syrinx

T

Tangerine Dream
Teeth of Lions Rule the Divine
The Telescopes
Theatre of Eternal Music
This Will Destroy You
Thrones
Thou
Troum

U

Ufomammut
Mirko Uhlig

V

Vibracathedral Orchestra

W

Yoshi Wada
Michael Waller
Wapstan
Klaus Wiese
Steven Wilson
Windy & Carl

Y

Year of No Light
Yellow Swans
La Monte Young

References

Works cited

 
 
 
 
 
 
 
 
 
 

Drone Music